General Hilmi Özkök (born 4 August 1940 in Turgutlu, Manisa Province) is a Turkish general who served as the 24th Chief of the General Staff of the Turkish Armed Forces. He took up that post on August 28, 2002, and served until August 30, 2006, when he retired and was succeeded by General Yaşar Büyükanıt.

Özkök has expressed support for Turkey's alignment with the European Union, sought a reduced role for the National Security Council, and opposed his peers' plans to stage a coup.

Education and personal life
Hilmi Özkök was born in Turgutlu, Manisa Province, and has been a career soldier. He was educated at the Isiklar (Işıklar) Military High School in Bursa and went from there in 1957 to complete a two-year course at the Turkish Military Academy. Özkök left there as a second lieutenant in the Artillery. He has commanded an Artillery Gun Line, Forward Observation team, Fire Direction Center, SATA Battery, Battalion and Brigade. He has mostly worked with M114 155 mm howitzers and M198 howitzers. He has commanded a Brigade which included a MGM-140 ATACMS tactical ballistic missile battalion. He studied at the Army War College and the NATO Defence College in the 1970s.

He is married to Özenç Özkök and has two children.

In his retirement he is pursuing photography and poetry.

Career
After graduating from the Army War College in 1972, Özkök moved into military staff, initially with the Special Weapons Branch of the Allied Forces Southern Europe (AFSOUTH), and then at SHAPE. He was promoted to brigadier general in 1984 and worked as Chief of Planning and Operations for the General Staff (TGS). From 1986 to 1988 he commanded the 70th Infantry Brigade and on his promotion to major general in 1988 he commanded the 28th Infantry Division. He returned to the TGS in 1990 and was promoted to lieutenant general in 1992 when he was sent to Brussels to head the Turkish NATO Military Delegation for three years.

On August 30, 1996, Özkök was promoted to full general and took charge of the NATO Allied Land Forces South-Eastern Europe (LANDSOUTHEAST) located in İzmir. He returned again to the TGS in 1998, this time as Deputy Chief. After a brief stint as the commander of the First Army in Istanbul, he was made commander of the Turkish Army in 2002, succeeding Hüseyin Kıvrıkoğlu. He served as chairman until his retirement on August 30, 2006.

The Chronicle said that during his tenure as the chairman of the Joint Chiefs of Staff, he opposed the plans of some of his peers who wanted to stage another coup d'etat and narrowly evaded assassination with a tip-off from the CIA on 3 February 2004. Major general Fehmi Büyükbayram of the Ankara central garrison changed Özkök's schedule in order to protect him. Another attempt was allegedly prevented with a tip-off from the United Kingdom. Özkök recognized the allegations made in the Chronicle, but rejected some of the others, saying that the military would have taken the necessary precautions had they been true. In a 2007 interview Özkök said that he did not eat from the army canteen. People inferred that he feared poisoning, but Özkök replied that he merely wanted healthier food. A common complaint against him by his former colleagues has been that he often seems to avoid alcohol, as an admiral in Turkish navy wrote in his personal diary "what we found in his (ozkok) glass turned out to be Coca-Cola while he was pretending to be drinking

Awards
(Turkish) State Medal of Honor
Turkish Armed Forces Medal of Honor
Turkish Armed Forces Medal of Distinguished Service
Turkish Armed Forces Medal of Distinguished Courage and Self-Sacrifice
U.S. Legion Of Merit
Albania Golden Eagle
Pakistani Medal of Nishan-I Imtiaz
Great Cross for Military Merit of Spain
France Medal of Merit
Republic of Korea Tong-Il Medal.

References

1940 births
People from Turgutlu
Turkish Military Academy alumni
Army War College (Turkey) alumni
Turkish Army generals
Deputy Chiefs of the Turkish General Staff
Commanders of the Turkish Land Forces
Chiefs of the Turkish General Staff
Recipients of Nishan-e-Imtiaz
Foreign recipients of the Legion of Merit
Recipients of the Ordre national du Mérite
Order of National Security Merit members
Living people